This is a list of Billboard magazine's Top Hot 100 songs of 2003.

The list is also notable for only three songs appearing in the list from 2002. In contrast, as many as nine also appeared in the list from 2004.

See also
2003 in music
List of Billboard Hot 100 number-one singles of 2003
List of Billboard Hot 100 top-ten singles in 2003

References

United States Hot 100 Year-end
Billboard charts